Cross Gates (often spelled Crossgates)  is a suburb in east Leeds, West Yorkshire, England.

The area sits between Seacroft and Swarcliffe to the north, Whitkirk and Colton to the south, Killingbeck to the west and Austhorpe to the south east. Manston and Pendas Fields are also generally regarded as part of Cross Gates. It serves as an important transport hub for the nearby large housing estates of Seacroft, Whinmoor and Gipton.

At the 2011 census, Cross Gates had a population of 7,770, situated in the Cross Gates & Whinmoor ward of Leeds City Council with a population of 22,099.

Location

Etymology
According to the English Place-Name Society, the name Cross Gates is first reliably attested in 1771 and is therefore unlikely to be an old name. (A 1457 list of the assets of one Sir John Darcey mentions a "cross gate" near Whitkirk: 'unde mete eiusdem ville [Colton] incipiunt apud le Crosyate stans apud le Gildwell'. But this seems simply to denote a crossroads rather than being a place-name). In the Society's analysis, the word gates appears here in the dialect meaning 'roads', and so Cross Gates originally meant 'crossroads'. This interpretation supersedes earlier explanations which supposed that the place-name referred to a gate across the road.

History
The first references in the Whitkirk St. Marys Parish Register are from the 1630s:

Burial : 1630 July 26 - Thomas Norton, of Crosyeate
Burial : 1632 Mar 10 -  Norton, of Crosyeate

The earliest references in the Barwick in Elmet All Saints Parish Registers are from 1679 & 1680

Burial : Matthew, the son of Joshuah Lumb, at the cross Yeates on the Lower end on Hirst more, 24 March 1679
Baptism : Isable, the daughter of Joshuah Lumbe, at the Cross yates, on the Hurst moor, 18 July 1680

Historically, Cross Gates was located at the boundary of the ancient Parishes of Barwick in Elmet and Whitkirk. The line was roughly where Station Road lies today with everything to the north east in Barwick in Elmet and the south west in Whitkirk.  For hundreds of years it comprised no more than 1 or 2 cottages on the southern edge of the wastes of Whinmoor in an area called Low Moor or Hirst Moor. When Whinmoor was enclosed under the 1796 Barwick in Elmet Enclosure Act of Parliament regular sized fields were created and access roads built. The long straight Austhorpe Road was constructed in 1804 under this enclosure act. According to Platt and Morkhill, writing in the nineteenth century, "At the commencement of this century Cross Gates consisted only of some sixteen cottages, built near a gate which crossed the road leading from Whitkirk to Seacroft, then merely a by-lane, about fifty yard north of the small piece of ground now called Cross Gates Green. The use of this gate, we believe, was to prevent the cattle pastured on the adjacent common from straying down the lane.  By the side of the gate stood a small cottage for the gatekeeper".

The Waud family started coal mining along old Manston Lane in 1811 and in 1827 in the area by Cross Gates Shopping Centre.  Further pits were built on Church Lane and the area now occupied by the Marshall's.  The Leeds and Selby Railway was constructed in 1834 passing through Cross Gates and trackways were built from the railway along Church Lane to the pits.  The district was then rapidly expanding.  The Traveller's Rest Public House (then on the corner of Station Road and Austhorpe Road) opened in the 1860s.  The first Manston St. James C of E church was built in 1848 saving local residents the long trek to either Barwick in Elmet or Whitkirk.  The first school was built in 1857 on Austhorpe Road in the area now occupied by "The Arcade".  A Methodist Chapel opened in 1882 again on Austhorpe Road.

The local coal pits closed in 1882 and Cross Gates started to turn into a 'commuter village'. At this time Cross Gates was 'well removed' from the Leeds city centre and the factories and so Cross Gates began to attract Leeds' more affluent residents who could use the railway to quickly access the city.

In the twentieth century Cross Gates effectively became a suburb of Leeds, with the open fields in between being developed into housing. This also led to much development around Cross Gates, including the building of the Cross Gates estate, a development of council housing and private development around Austhorpe, Whitkirk and Manston.

Barnbow Tragedy

The worst tragedy ever to happen within Leeds (in terms of fatalities) was the Barnbow tragedy of 5 December 1916. 35 workers (all women aged 14 or over) were killed in the Barnbow Munitions Factory, which later became ROF Barnbow. The plant employed 16,000 workers, from Leeds, Selby, Wakefield, Tadcaster and Wetherby and had its own railway station to cope with the daily influx of workers. The railway station had an  platform and 38 special trains from surrounding towns and cities. An explosion from Hall 42 killed 35 workers and mutilated many more. Mechanic William Parking was presented with an engraved silver watch for his bravery in saving factory workers during the incident. There are two memorials: one in Manston Park and one on Cross Gates Road by the roundabout with the Ring Road.

Cross Gates Shopping Centre

The demolition of Gas holder Number Two at the Cross Gates Gasworks made way for a shopping centre in Cross Gates as some felt that Cross Gates was badly lacking in amenities. This led to the building of the Cross Gates Arndale Centre. It opened on 21 September 1967 and was situated on the old coal and goods yards, which were behind what is now the parade of shops at the bottom of Station Road, just north of the Station Pub. In the mid-1980s it was renamed Cross Gates Shopping Centre and was renamed again into Crossgates in January 2005 as a consequence of new ownership and re-branding. This is a large indoor shopping centre (approximately 200,000 sq.ft) containing retailers such as Peacocks, Newlook, Select, Iceland, Wilko, Home Bargains, Superdrug and Bon Marche. There is also a LB's situated upstairs, Flavours Cafe, and several banks and building societies with almost 60 stores in total. The centre is 'L'-shaped, with both legs being approximately equal in length. The centre is single storey, except for the central part where there is a second storey containing LB's cafe, and an external unit with an East of India restaurant. The barrelled roofs at the Station Road and Austhorpe Road entrances were added several years after the shopping centre's construction in 1967 – they were refurbished in 2001. There have been many small-scale renovations in the Centre since its construction, including the car parks, which are operated on a ticket-on-entry and pay-on-foot system.

Other shopping facilities in Cross Gates are found along Austhorpe Road. Cross Gates' main supermarket was originally a branch of Fine Fare next to the Methodist Church on Austhorpe Road, and then the GEM supermarket (formerly the Regal Cinema which was demolished for GEM to be built) which later became an Asda on the western side of the roundabout where the Ring Road meets Cross Gates Road. This later became a 'Questword' supermarket and is now Mecca Bingo. There are also nearby shopping facilities in Halton (among them a newly built Lidl), Seacroft (the Seacroft Shopping centre, with a large Tesco Extra), and Colton (the Colton Retail Park), which has a Sainsbury's, DW Sports Fitness and an Argos, as well as various eating locations.

Housing
The area's housing includes detached houses, semi-detached houses and terraced houses. A block of new low-rise flats has been built opposite the Crossgates Shopping Centre, and apartments are being sold and rented at very high prices. Austhorpe Road and the areas surrounding Marshall Street are made up largely of Victorian through terraces. There are some upmarket Victorian villas around Tranquility Avenue.

Manston Park

Manston Park is a large park in Cross Gates with football pitches, a bowling green, tennis courts and a playground.  It is owned and managed by Leeds City Council and was opened in August 1925.

Transport
Cross Gates railway station is on the Leeds to Selby line, now part of the York and Selby Lines in the timetables. It is a well used stop for residents commuting to Leeds or York city centres. In June 2006 Cross Gates won the award for "Best Kept Railway Station" in all of Yorkshire, having made major strides in the refurbishment of the station.

Cross Gates is also close to the A64 dual carriageway and the M1. The A6120 Leeds Outer Ring Road "Station Road" is the main road through the area. The 650 metre "Manston Lane Link Road" (MLLR), which forms part of the East Leeds Orbital Road (ELOR), is intended to connect a new area of Leeds called the "East Leeds Extension" (ELE), through a new commercial development at Thorpe Park to the M1 over the Leeds/York railway line.

Industry

A Royal Ordnance Factory, ROF Leeds, was built at Barnbow, off Manston Lane, producing guns and ammunition for the army and navy. The building was bought by Vickers Defence Systems and produced the Challenger 2 tank before it closed in 2004. After several years of being used for storage, the building was demolished in 2018.

Bus manufacturer Optare, formerly Charles H Roe, also had a factory on Manston Lane before it closed in 2011 and production was moved to Sherburn in Elmet.

The haulage company J Long & Sons are based on Sandleas Way.

Major printer and direct mail company Communisis has its main site on Manston Lane.

'Gates' sculpture

In 2009 the council developed the roundabout on the Leeds Ring Road on the north side with 3 stone signs saying "Welcome to Cross Gates" and a sculpture composed of 3 large metal gates by architect John Thorp, at a cost of £143,000. They were originally painted red, black and white, but this was changed to the present red, blue and silver, as the original colours are those of Manchester United. The sculpture is meant to represent Cross Gates metaphorically, each gate having a large 'X' in steel in its design to reflect the history of the town's name. Local residents have expressed different views on the structure, some finding it an asset to the area, others finding it an eyesore.

Comparison
Cross Gates lies in the LS15 postcode area. Here is a population breakdown of the postcode area in comparison with the UK population.

Location grid

References

External links

YEP Cross Gates Today Community Website
 Crossgates Shopping Centre
 Crossgates Town Centre regeneration – Leeds City Council  
 VE Day 60 Years:Leeds – Manufacturing at Cross Gates
  – Cross Gates was described as being in the parishes of Whitkirk and Barwick in Elmet
  – Cross Gates was described as being in the parishes of Whitkirk and Barwick in Elmet

Cross Gates

es:Cross Gates